Paper wrapped cake is a type of Chinese cake. It is one of the most common pastries served in Hong Kong. It can also be found in most Chinatown bakery shops. In essence, it is a chiffon cake baked in a paper cup.

In the bakeries of Chinatown, San Francisco, it is commonly referred to as "sponge cake."

Preparation 
Traditionally prepared wrapped cakes are usually steamed in a wok pan, however, Chinese-American sponge cakes are usually baked in an oven. The cakes are typically prepared by separating the egg yolks and whites, and whisking them separately as well.

Texture 
Typically prepared and served wrapped in parchment paper squares, Chinese paper wrapped cakes have a deep, golden brown exterior, and a light, fluffy inside. The subtle texture is complemented by a subtle sweetness, which allows them to be served as-is.

Serving 
The cakes are typically served in the paper they were baked in. Found in bakeries, the cakes are typically eaten during breakfast, or teatime.

See also
 Egg waffle

References

Hong Kong cuisine
Hong Kong desserts
Sponge cakes
Breakfast dishes
Tea culture